This unit is not to be confused with the 1st Maryland Cavalry, Potomac Home Brigade.

The 1st Maryland Cavalry Regiment was a cavalry regiment of the Union Army during the American Civil War.

Service
Companies organized and mustered in between April and August 1861 in Baltimore and Pennsylvania, and served in the Department of West Virginia and the Army of the Potomac; in Hatch's Cavalry Brigade, Department of the Shenandoah, from March, 1862; in the Cavalry Brigade, 2nd Corps (really the old 5th Corps), Army of Virginia, from June 1862; with the Cavalry Brigade, 11th Corps, Army of the Potomac, from September 1862; various brigades/divisions, Cavalry Corps, Army of the Potomac, from January 1863; Provost Marshal General's Command, Army of the Potomac, from October 1863; from June 1864 in 10th Corps, Army of the James, then in the 3rd Brigade of the Cavalry Division, Army of the James, until April, 1865; cavalry and duty in the Department of Virginia until mustered out in August 1865.

The regiment particularly distinguished itself at the cavalry battles of Brandy Station and Gettysburg.  During part of its time in 10th Corps, the regiment fought dismounted, and for the remainder was brigaded with the 1st Regiment New York Mounted Rifles.

Total strength and casualties
The regiment lost 3 officers and 65 enlisted men killed or mortally wounded and 3 officers and 130 enlisted men to disease.

Commanders
 Lieutenant Colonel James Monroe Deems (at Gettysburg)

See also

List of Maryland Civil War units

Notes

References
The Civil War Archive

External links
 FamilySearch 1st Regiment, Maryland Cavalry (Union)	
 Civil War in the East 1st Maryland Cavalry Regiment
 Stone Sentinels 1st Maryland Cavalry Monument at Gettysburg

Units and formations of the Union Army from Maryland
Military units and formations established in 1861
Military units and formations disestablished in 1865
1865 disestablishments in Maryland
1861 establishments in Maryland